Barsom is a surname. Notable people with the surname include:

Abgar Barsom (born 1977), Aramean-Swedish football player
Valerie Barsom, American attorney and politician

See also
Barson